Nikolai Avenirovich Martynov (Russian:Николай Авенирович Мартынов; 1842–1913) was a Russian painter and watercolorist.

Life and work 

He graduated from the Moscow School of Painting, Sculpture and Architecture, and taught at various gymnasia in Moscow. In 1867, his watercolor renderings of the frescoes at Nereditsa Church earned him a bronze medal at the Exposition Universelle in Paris.

In the 1880s, he was a private tutor to the children of the Sabashnikov merchant family, including , who became a book publisher. While living at their dacha he wrote Курс рисования для средних учебных заведений»  (A Drawing Course for Secondary Institutions). In 1883, he gave private lessons to the future graphic artist, Maria Yakunchikova, and her sister Vera.  and Nikolai Bartram were also his students. 

He was also a regular contributor to Russkiye Vedomosti. His memories of a visit with Leo Tolstoy at Yasnaya Polyana were published by them in 1891.

He lived and held classes in a large mansion owned by Viktor Nikolayevich Martynov (relationship unknown), an inspector of Caucasian and Crimean estates.

His works may be seen at the Tretyakov Gallery and the museum at the Abramtsevo Colony, with which he was associated. Several watercolors of birds are in the collection of the State Darwin Museum.

References

Further reading 
 "Мартынов, Николай Авенирович", In :Большая русская биографическая энциклопедия (Great Russian Biographical Encyclopedia), selections from the Great Russian Encyclopedia on DVD-ROM, Бизнессофт, 2006

External links

 ПОДМОСКОВНАЯ СТАРИНА (From Old Moscow, 1889), an album of color lithographs @ LiveInternet

1842 births
1913 deaths
Russian painters
Russian watercolorists
Russian landscape painters
Artists from Moscow
Moscow School of Painting, Sculpture and Architecture alumni